The animated series Amphibia features a number of characters created by Matt Braly. The series centers on Anne Boonchuy who opens a mysterious music box that transports herself and her friends to the world of Amphibia. Anne is adopted by the Plantars, the adventurous Sprig, feisty Polly, and the wise Hop Pop as they go on various adventures and face numerous dangers. Anne's human friends include Sasha and Marcy. Much of the show revolves around Anne interacting with the residents of Wartwood who start off hostile towards her but slowly welcome her as one of them.

This is a list of the characters that appear in this show.

Overview

Main

Anne Boonchuy

Anne Savisa Boonchuy is a Thai-American human girl originally from Los Angeles, California, who, on her 13th birthday, is magically transported to Amphibia alongside her friends Sasha and Marcy by a mysterious chest known as the Calamity Box. She is a self-assured and fearless teen with the spirit of an adventurer, and is voiced by Brenda Song.

Sprig Plantar

Sprig Plantar is a pink Poison dart frog and Anne's best friend. He is a very adventurous and energetic whose both qualities that can bring him to adventure and into trouble respectively. Despite acting carelessly at times, he is utterly loyal to his friends and family, and will ultimately do what is right in the end. It is also implied that Sprig has ADHD as he admits that he has a short attention span. He was the first person to befriend Anne and showed the most sympathy towards her plight; having to convince Hop Pop to take her in. Despite being very close with Anne, he would still prefer his own personal space and has admitted that he has no romantic interest in her. While he can be at odds with Hop Pop, Sprig does care about him a lot and likes to spend personal time with him. Sprig also has a typical sibling rivalry with Polly but is also protective of her. Early in the first season, Sprig gets roped into an arranged marriage with the creepy Maddie Flour. While he stayed loyal about it, they ultimately broke it off with Sprig realizing that Maddie was pretty cool despite her personality. He actually develops a closer relationship with Ivy Sundew, whom he has known since childhood. He saw her as a friend, but slowly fell in love with her and has since tried impressing her. They eventually become a couple by the end of the season. When Sasha returns and pushes her influence on Anne, Sprig steps up for her and heroically tells her that Anne deserved better and that she had been a terrible friend to her.

In season two, Sprig and his family travel with Anne to Newtopia to look for clues regarding the Calamity Box. While on the road, Sprig displays natural hunting skills, that he teaches to Anne, as well as perfect vocal mimicry. Upon arriving in Newtopia, the group meets Marcy, one of Anne's friends, and Sprig becomes highly suspicious of her and protective of Anne due to their past meeting with Sasha. He ultimately accepts her as a friend. Sprig is also revealed to be smart to a certain degree as he was immediately accepted into Newtopia University despite his age. He drops out almost right away due to the pressure. In "Hopping Mall", he tells Anne that he does not remember his mom as he was too little. This news brings him and Anne closer together. Upon his return to Wartwood, he begins to openly date Ivy Sundew. In the season two finale, he and his family accompany Anne back to her home in Los Angeles.

In season three, Sprig and his family join Anne when she is transported back to Los Angeles. He becomes particularly obsessed with being considered a Boonchuy as Anne is considered a Plantar. He is revealed to be a natural in Sepak takraw. He turns 11 in "Sprig's Birthday" and further reveals that his signature hat was given to him by his parents. At one point, he tries to become a superhero named Frog-Man (in the mold of Spider-Man), but gives up when he realizes that he was simply seeking attention. Sprig eventually returns to Amphibia with Anne and his family. He resumes his relationship with Ivy, much to everyone's annoyance, but when the two of them nearly ruin a mission, they decide to pull it back a bit. He also overcomes his prejudice with Grime and begins to take fighting advice from him. Sprig becomes instrumental in defeating Andrias when he reads him a letter he found that came from Leif, which is enough to drive him to tears.

As Anne saves Amphibia from the Core, Sprig finally accepts the fact that Anne will leave forever. He has one final goodbye with her before she is gone for good. In the epilogue, Sprig has devoted himself to becoming an adventurer and prepares to travel to a new continent alongside Ivy.

Hop Pop Plantar

Hopediah "Hop Pop" Plantar is an orange Poison dart frog who is the grandfather of Sprig and Polly, and the adoptive grandfather of Anne. Very protective of his grandkids, Hop Pop was unsure of taking Anne in due to her strange anatomy. However, he learns to welcome her when she owns up to accidentally breaking his cane. Hop Pop is prone to be stuck in his old ways. He eventually bonds with Anne when he realizes that they share a lot in common in terms of personality. He was also rather bossy to the kids but learns to be open-minded when Sprig brings him humility, and is also opportunistic. He is well informed about the Calamity Box, the music box that brought Anne and her friends to Amphibia, but feigns understanding anything about it due to its dangerous origins. After operating as a beetle racer called "Wrecker", he buries it in his front lawn to prevent any danger and has been hiding it from Anne since. Oddly enough, he was oblivious at the knowledge that the Plantars have had a long storied history of being adventurers and explorers, but did not seem all that bothered upon learning so. Hop Pop loves his grandchildren evenly, though Sprig can be more bothersome to him than Polly. He had a long reciprocated love with Ivy Sundew's grandmother and Felicia Sundew's mother, Sylvia Sundew who upon returning to Wartwood Swamp, resumed her relationship with him. Throughout the first season, Hop Pop struggles to keep his fruit stand up and running and ends up losing it when he cannot pay his debt; effectively putting him out of a job. He fights against the system by running for Mayor against Mayor Toadstool but loses when he fails to reach out to the inhabitants outside of Wartwood Swamp. However, the Wartwood Swamp citizens build him a new stand to show their support. His efforts are revealed to have been viewed as a threat by the Toads of Toad Tower who try, but fail, to get rid of him.

In season two, Hop Pop leads Anne and the Plantars to Newtopia in a "fwagon" (short for family wagon) and leaves their house in the care of Chuck. He opts to leave the Calamity Box behind, claiming that he had a friend who was examining it. While on the road, Hop Pop displays a heroic attitude and further revels on his failed background as an actor, getting the chance to fulfill this dream, albeit with criminals. While in Newtopia, he briefly has a crisis when he realizes that he is not ready for Sprig to leave him and learns from an old friend named Sal that he needs to embrace change and the future. Anne figures out that Hop Pop had been lying to her about the Calamity Box. He soon reveals to her that he had feared losing Sprig and Polly as he when he ventured out years ago, their parents were killed by monster herons and he has blamed himself for not being there to protect them. Anne forgives him for trying to hide the box and he agrees to help her continue her search home. In the season two finale, Hop Pop accompanies Anne back to Los Angeles along with his grandkids.

In season three, Hop Pop and his family join Anne when she is transported back to Los Angeles. He begins to view their time in Anne's world as important and does not want to be seen as unimportant or taking advantage of the Boonchuys. He is revealed to be a natural at Khon, and befriends an aspiring elderly actor who looks like him named Humphrey Westwood. Hop Pop eventually returns to Amphibia with Anne and his family. He and his family end up returning to Earth when Andrias starts his invasion. During this time, he is confronted by two mind controlled herons that just so happen to be the same ones that killed his family. With Anne's help, he overcomes this and tames them with the help of Sprig and Polly.

Following Anne saving Amphibia and her leaving back home alongside Sasha and Marcy, Hop Pop continues to garden, now including California Avocados. He is also shown to have settled with Sylvia Sundew.

Bill Farmer, who provides the voice for Hop Pop, named the character as one of his favorite roles. He also felt he had a greater creative control on his performance as Hop Pop than other roles such as Goofy due to not being a pre-existing character.

Polly Plantar

Polly Petunia Plantar is Sprig's outgoing and fearless polliwog sister. She loves adventure, monsters, and having fun with her family. Although she is young, she has the heart of an explorer. Upon meeting Anne, Polly was disappointed in the fact that she was not a ferocious monster. Polly spends much of the first season as a comic foil while being viewed as a helpless child, despite displaying abilities to the contrary. She is an expert spitter and does not like situating herself in typical "girly" roles. She also has the unusual ability to expel a powerful shriek which she refers to as "singing". She thinks that romance is gross and loves to be in charge by displaying her cuteness. However, Polly is shown to be frightened by scary things and does not like to be alone. Plus, she still needs to be saved from danger due to being small enough for predators. She once claimed that she has been eaten eight times throughout her life and "looks forward to it". Nevertheless, she is a major force to be reckoned with and has gotten Anne and her family out of serious conflicts with nothing, but sheer determination and her amazing prowess.

In season two, Polly, her family, and Anne head off to Newtopia to seek answers for the Calamity Box. While on the road, she fears that she is considered a nuisance due to her young age, but realizes that her family loves her unconditionally. She is also shown to have the ability to conduct electricity, and has perfect vocal mimicry. Upon reaching Newtopia, Polly learns from Anne's friend Marcy that she will eventually grow legs in two months' time. She also attempts to be closer to Anne by hanging out with her, though in their usual fashion they end up causing trouble for everyone. Sprig reveals that Polly never met their mother as she was too little to know her. Upon returning to Wartwood, Polly gets her first taste of responsibility when she takes up Frobo, a robot frog that had been following the Plantars. In the season two finale, Polly finally grows her legs, though they are rather minuscule, and accompanies Anne back to her home in Los Angeles.

In season three, Polly and her family join Anne when she is transported back to Los Angeles. She is revealed to have picked up Thai language fluently after watching numerous Thai rom-coms. She attempts to rebuild Frobo, but ultimately only succeeds in bringing his head back to life. However, with the help of the IT Girls, she also picks up knowledge on robotics and electronics. Polly eventually returns to Amphibia with Anne and her family. She later uses her newfound electronic skills to rebuild and upgrade Frobo.

Following Anne saving Amphibia and her leaving back home alongside Sasha and Marcy, Polly immediately grows a strand of hair. Sometime later, Polly eventually becomes a full frog, though she still lacks the familiar frog snout.

Sasha Waybright

Sasha Elizabeth Waybright is Anne and Marcy's friend who was captured by Grime and eventually became his new lieutenant after she proved her prowess in battle. In spite of her manipulative and bossy nature, she does genuinely care about her friends. Upon her capture at the hands of Grime and the Toads, Sasha used her persuasive abilities to have the Toads be friendly and serve her. When their tower gets attacked by a pair of giant herons, Sasha convinces Grime to take her advice so that they could defeat the herons in battle. Pleased with the outcome, Sasha is made lieutenant by Grime, a position she hopes to use to find her friends. She eventually reunites with Anne at the end of "Anne of the Year" and reveals her connection with the Toads, inviting all of Wartwood to Toad Tower for a celebratory banquet. While Sasha is happy to be with Anne again, she reveals the motivation behind inviting Wartwood to the tower, which is to sacrifice Hop Pop due to his status as an unintentional revolutionary symbol. Sasha duels with Anne to determine Hop Pop's fate, and initially has the upper hand. Sasha loses the duel when Anne stands up to her once and for all, and her right cheek is permanently scarred. When the tower is destroyed by One-Eyed Wally's exploding boom-shrooms, Sasha begins to fall off some crumbling masonry but is narrowly rescued by Anne and the Plantars. However, she comes to the realization that she has indeed been a terrible friend and willingly lets herself fall, but is saved by Grime who takes her away.

Sometime later, Sasha tries to uphold Grime's reputation; angered at his now lazy and unmotivated self. While battling General Yunan, Sasha admits that she does not want to lose Grime because he is her only friend, causing Grime to deduce that Sasha misses Anne and that she believes she has permanently ruined her friendship with her. After defeating Yunnan, the two decide to take over Newtopia by force. She proves her worth to the other Toad captains by helping Grime retrieve Barrel's Warhammer, during which she admits that she wants to prove that she can make it on her own without Anne and Marcy after learning that they have teamed up. However, in the process, she loses Grime's remaining subordinates Percy and Braddock who believe that she has become too harsh. Sasha and Grime later reunite with Anne, Marcy and the Plantars; claiming that they have changed and want to help. She helps out with the third temple and recharges the final gem while losing the pink hue in her eyes. Despite having supposedly been redeemed in Anne and Marcy's eyes, she and Grime are continuing their plan, which she now seems to regret due to how it would affect Anne and Marcy if this plan goes through. Despite this, she denies having any sentimentality when speaking to Grime, but loses her temper when Anne and Marcy bring up her past misdeeds. She accepts that while she may not have changed yet, her friends have and must learn to cope with that. She also learns to be less in control and more supportive when she, Anne and Marcy reform their garage band, Sasha and the Sharps. She and Grime attempt to put her plan into motion, but discover too late that Andrias had sinister plans for Amphibia and tries to stop him. She allows Anne to escape back to Los Angeles while she stays behind in Amphibia to help Grime thwart Andrias.

Sasha ends up fleeing to Wartwood with Grime where she begins to realize that her actions resulted in Marcy getting severely injured. She finds Anne's journal and touched by how much her friendship meant to her, decides to instead lead the Wartwood citizens to fight Andrias. Between Anne teleporting to Los Angeles and returning to Wartwood, Sasha had become a resistance leader in the fight against Andrias. Afraid that she will somehow ruin her friendship with Anne again, Sasha tries to pass command duties to her, who turns out to be bad at it. Anne eventually reveals that she has renewed confidence in her to do the right thing and Sasha takes command again. Sasha also decided that she and Anne will co-lead the resistances and they both vow to rescue Marcy from King Andrias. Her relationship with the citizens of Wartwood has vastly improved, though she admits that she has to make difficult decisions with them. Sasha admits that she is upset with Marcy for putting them in the situation that they are in, but Anne tells her that she needs to learn to forgive much like how she did with her. Thanks to this, Sasha overcomes her past and frees Marcy from the Core's control.

Sasha is eventually imbued with the pink gem power to help with defeating the Core, but has to give it up to Anne so that she can defeat it on her own. She has an emotional goodbye with Grime before leaving. Ten years later, Sasha has earned a psychology degree and become a peer counselor for children, though she still maintains her tough and determined spirit.

While only implied and not outright stated within the show, Matt Braly confirmed that Sasha is bisexual.

Captain Grime

Captain Grimothy "Grime" is a one-eyed cane toad who is the former ruler of Toad Tower. Early in the series, he captures Sasha and believes her to be a spy after he shows her Anne's missing shoe. While intimidating, his army is the total opposite; composed of cowards who would rather do anything other than be ruthless guards for his conquered land. When a couple of giant herons proceeds to attack Toad Tower, he finds an unlikely ally in his former prisoner Sasha, who convinces him to be more accepting to his lackeys and be more positive and uplifting. After the Toads manage to defeat the herons, Grime realizes the value that Sasha holds and makes her his lieutenant. Sometime later, Grime leads his army to capture the frogs in Wartwood, following Hop Pop's failed effort to replace Mayor Toadstool and plans to have him killed. At his suggestion, Anne and Sasha do battle with one another, ending with the destruction of Toad Tower. Grime rescues Sasha, showing that he genuinely cares about her well-being, and flees with the Toads.

Since then, Grime has lost most of his army, leaving only Percy, Braddock, and Sasha. He has become a lazy, unmotivated moocher who spends his time watching Sasha's phone. He is branded a traitor by Newtopia and becomes a wanted criminal with General Yunnan pursuing him. However, Sasha inspires him to regain his former glory by creating a new army to take over Newtopia. He makes a plea to the other Toad captains, including his younger sister Beatrix, to lead an army uprising against King Andrias and proves his worth by having himself and Sasha retrieve Barrel's Warhammer, successfully doing so. They join Anne, Marcy and the Plantars with completing the third temple and while Sasha appears to finally feel accepted by her friends, Grime insists they continue with their plan. He and Sasha stay with the Sundews while in Wartwood where he displays a playful jovial side. Additionally, he is well learned with the harp and capable of playing beautiful melodies. Despite this, he tries to usurp King Andrias for rule over Amphibia, but discovers that he already has sinister motives for the land. Grime ultimately helps Anne escape back to Los Angeles.

Grime and Sasha end up fleeing to Wartwood to escape Andrias. He plans to continue running and meet up with the rest of the toads that evaded capture, but gets coaxed by Sasha to stay and defend Wartwood, ultimately taking her lead instead. He is soon forced to train Sprig and while annoyed by it at first, begins to acknowledge his skills and begins to respect him even after they fought off a swarm of hybeenas (a race of hyena/bee hybrids). During the final fight with Andrias, Grime has his left arm sliced off by Darcy when protecting Sasha, but manages to survive.

Following Anne saving Amphibia, Grime shares a tearful goodbye with Sasha before she returns to Earth permanently alongside Anne and Marcy. In the epilogue, Grime works with the others races of Amphibia as an explorer and delegate of peace.

Marcy Wu

Marcy Regina Wu is Sasha's and Anne's other human friend who found the Calamity Box first in a shop on Anne's birthday and was also teleported to Amphibia. She serves as the brains of the trio, and is an expert but somewhat clumsy gamer. When she, Anne, and Sasha were transported to Amphibia, she found herself in Newtopia where she was accepted by the inhabitants and became King Andrias' chief advisor and ranger. After spending months with them, she was happily reunited with Anne and was introduced to the Plantars for the first time. It becomes apparent that while she is still clumsy, Marcy had become more adventurous and is capable of taking care of herself while also expanding her knowledge of Amphibian culture and anatomy. However, she admits that she is jealous of Anne's ability to be social with every person she meets. Marcy spends half her time trying to do research on the Calamity Box so that she, Anne and Sasha can return home. Marcy and Anne come to accept that Sasha looked down on them despite her genuinely caring about them, but they still miss her and want to reunite with her to make things right. Marcy ultimately has to stay in Newtopia while Anne and the Plantars return to Wartwood to retrieve the Calamity Box. However, Andrias approaches her with a proposition. She arrives in Wartwood to aid Anne and the Plantars with recharging the first gem on the Calamity Box. During this time, she comes to realize that she has a problem with disacknowledging problems around her and willingly forfeits one of the challenges. This ends up being the test, and they successfully recharge the gem with Marcy's eyes noticeably losing their green hue. Afterwards, she begins to live in the fwagon outside of the Plantars' house and begins to experience the same outcast treatment that Anne had when she first came to Wartwood, becoming even more disappointed when even Polly treated her poorly just because she follows others. She grows close to Maddie Flour due to their interests in magic. Marcy helps with completing the third temple where she happily reunites with Sasha. In the season two finale, it is revealed that Marcy knew about the Calamity Box's power all along. After learning that her parents were planning to move, she feared being alone and manipulated Sasha and Anne to steal the box from the thrift store in the hopes that being transported to another world would keep them together forever. She helps her friends fight King Andrias when he reveals his sinister motivations. Marcy attempts to make amends by getting the box to create a portal home, but while trying to go through, she is stabbed through the torso by Andrias.

Marcy's body is placed in a suspended animation tank and a special outfit by the Frog-Bots to help her recuperate so that King Andrias can make further use of her. She is later rescued by Lady Olivia and General Yunan in an effort to overthrow King Andrias which did leave her loopy at first. However, she is immediately captured again and used as a vessel to contain an entity known as the Core as it uploads itself into the multi-eyed helmet that is compatible with the outfit that Marcy was placed in as Andrias has tried many times to get the Core to reconsider it's choice for a host. In this new form, she is referred to as Darcy (Dark Marcy). Marcy's personality is kept in a prison designed to feed into her desires, which is to live in a fantasy world and stay forever with her friends Sasha and Anne. However, she comes to realize the fakeness of this life and shatters the illusion. Sasha manages to free her and Marcy makes peace with the idea of moving now knowing her bond with her friends is stronger than that.

Marcy is eventually imbued with the green gem power to help with defeating the Core, but has to give it up to Anne so that she can defeat it on her own. She has an emotional goodbye with Olivia, Yunan and a repentant Andrias. Ten years later, Marcy has become a webcomic author, though she is still clumsy and uncoordinated.

King Andrias Leviathan

King Andrias Leviathan is a towering Chinese giant salamander who is the king of Amphibia. While appearing to be a jovial and kindly ruler, he seems to be plotting something involving Anne, Sasha, and Marcy. He loves riddles as he has a habit of having Marcy go through a series of puzzles just so he can give her a simple message. Upon first meeting, he is boisterous and happy-go-lucky, something that upsets his advisor Lady Olivia. He takes to many human customs and culture such as a fist bump and was glad to see Anne for the first time after Marcy told him all about her and proceeded to give the Plantars his royal credit card. He continued to study the Calamity Box with Marcy for the majority of Anne and the Plantars' stay. When they left Newtopia to go retrieve the Calamity Box, he enigmatically approached Marcy with a proposition. It is later revealed that Anne, Marcy and the Plantars' mission involves undoing a prophecy so that Andrias and his mysterious master, a giant multi-eyed monster, can enact an unspecified revenge. He briefs his master of the progress after cutting off Yunan informing him about the civil unrests, the meeting of the toad lords and Grime still being at large. In the season two finale, King Andrias is revealed to be evil and power-hungry. Many years ago, Newtopia was a thriving city, but following the Calamity Box's disappearance, it had lost its glory. He wanted the box back not for knowledge, but for conquering other worlds. He battles Anne and her friends before witnessing her using the blue gem powers to fight back. As Anne and the Plantars escape through a portal back to Los Angeles, Andrias stabs Marcy through the torso as he quotes to them "Now look what you made me do!"

In season three, King Andrias keeps Marcy alive in a suspension tank and now plots to kill Anne who is the only one capable of derailing his plans. He starts by sending one of his Frog-Bots called Cloak-Bot to do the job and obtain the latest copy of a novel series that Marcy got him hooked on. Displeased that Cloak-Bot hasn't killed Anne yet and that it only got Book 3 of the novel series when Book 2 was sold out, King Andrias activates the Cloak-Bot's timer giving it the rest of the day to kill Anne before its self-destruct sequence is initiated. Back in Newtopia, Andrias reveals his multi-eyed master known as the Core whom he communicates with via his crown. After Olivia and Yunan free Marcy, Andrias intercepts them and revealed that he and the Core were watching them. He had used the DNA of the Moss Men due to their healing properties and the studies on the Shadowfish enabled the ancients to cheat death enough to be preserved in the Core. Under its command, Andrias uses Marcy as a vessel to contain the Core within her, despite that he genuinely likes the human girl and even showing some sort of remorse for his actions as he had asked the Core to reconsider its choice for a host. In "Froggy Little Christmas", he has managed to grow his army to an incredible size and sent a remote-controlled drone to make up for the Cloak-Bot's failure. After its destruction, Darcy called him "pathetic" and assures that his army will invade Earth to destroy his enemies once and for all. In "The Core & The King", Andrias is revealed to have had two friends named Barrel, a toad, and Leif, a frog, the latter of whom he was implied to have been in love with. When Leif warned him about a possible apocalyptic future involving the Calamity Box, Andrias' father, Aldrich, convinces him that she is a traitor and she escapes; convincing him that he was betrayed and damaging his friendship with Barrel. Andrias and Darcy soon launch their invasion of Earth during which, Sprig shows him a letter written by Leif. The truth of her feeling for him weakens his resolve to fight and convinces him to allow Anne to defeat him in battle; revealing that he had partially turned himself into a cyborg to prolong his life. Andrias' body was brought back to Amphibia.

Andrias ultimately overcomes his father's influence by crushing his crown and helps Anne, Sasha and Marcy with defeating the Core by sending his Frogbots to aid them. He has an emotional goodbye with Marcy; repentant for his actions. In the epilogue, Andrias's eyesight and body have begun to deteriorate, having chosen not to continue maintaining his cyborg body, and he has taken up gardening with help from a gardening Frogbot.

The Core

The Core is an evil, monstrous, mechanical multi-eyed entity that King Andrias serves. It is an artificial intelligence composed of the collective preserved memories of Amphibia's greatest minds which includes past scholars and rulers of Amphibia including King Andrias's father King Aldrich. When Marcy was revived, Andrias uses her to be the host for the Core after failing to get it to reconsider its choice for a host as it uploads itself into the armor she was placed in and a multi-eyed helmet was placed on Marcy's head.

In this new form, they are referred to as Darcy (short for Dark Marcy). It appears again in "Froggy Little Christmas", mocking Andrias' efforts to destroy Anne, calling him "pathetic", but the latter assures it that his army is going to invade Earth and destroy his enemies once and for all. The Core begins to mimic some of Marcy's personality quirks and interests. Additionally, it is revealed to be a complex computer that contains the memories of Andrias' ancestors including his father King Aldrich as it starts to talk in his voice. It is later revealed that despite its extensive knowledge like anticipating the strategy from the film "War of the Warlocks", Darcy still does not know much about the Calamity Box; a fact that Anne uses to spare her life. By the end of "The Beginning of the End", Darcy launches its invasion of Earth. Darcy goes face to face with Sasha and Grime; resulting in them slicing Grime's arm off and making a large cut in Sasha's back. Despite her taunts, Sasha kills Darcy by slicing their neural link and frees Marcy. However, the helmet sprouts legs and flees. It attaches itself to the moon (the newts having experimented on it in the past) and attempts to crash into the planet as it refuses to be defeated. The Core is eventually destroyed by Anne after she absorbs the power of all three gems.

Supporting

Wartwood Swamp inhabitants
The following characters are the inhabitants of Wartwood Swamp:

 Bessie (vocal effects provided by Dee Bradley Baker) - A giant snail who serves as the Plantar family's mode of transportation. It is revealed in "Anne Theft Auto" that Hop Pop won Bessie in a bid to determine who gets to keep her. Anne learns to drive her in that same episode. She is very loving and has an affinity for mushrooms. By season 2, Bessie pulls the Fwagon that the Plantars ride in during their trip to Newtopia. Upon her return, she begins to act as a mother figure to MicroAngelo. Despite being a separate species, she is shown to have mated with Joe Sparrow and produced snail-shelled offspring in the epilogue.
 MicroAngelo (vocal effects provided by Dee Bradley Baker) - A small snail that the Plantars adopted in Newtopia. He becomes close to Bessie.
 Mayor Frodrick Toadstool (voiced by Stephen Root) - A toad who is the corrupt, treacherous, greedy, and arrogant mayor of Wartwood Swamp. He has a tendency to raise the taxes on anything. He tends to use Anne as an opportunity to further his image. Despite his flaws, he can do something nice and even do the unexpected for the greater good, though he has admitted that he is only willing to help his citizens just so he can swindle them. However following these events, he grows softer on the people of Wartwood and becomes a more responsible mayor to them, though he still displays some corrupt tendencies. In the epilogue, he has retired from his mayoral duties and now assists new mayor Toadie.
 Toadie (voiced by Jack McBrayer) - A small frog who is Mayor Toadstool's loyal personal assistant. He has started learning to be more independent from him. Toadie even starts to learn how to go offensive like when it comes to dealing with marauders. In the epilogue, Toadie has become the Mayor of Wartwood, supported by Toadstool.
 Buck Leatherleaf (voiced by James Adomian) - The sheriff of Wartwood.
 Walliam "One-Eyed Wally" Ribbiton (voiced by James Patrick Stuart) - A local town vagrant with one working eye and half a shoe on one foot who plays a caterpillar-shaped accordion. Anne initially viewed him with disdain, but has since accepted his eccentricities. He comes from a rich family that resides in Ribbitvale, but wants to live the life of a vagrant which his father had to accept. Only Anne and the Plantars are aware of his double life. He is also shown to be a natural at Muay Thai. 
 Sadie Croaker (voiced by Laila Berzins) - An old lady with a cataract in her left eye. She runs Croaker Dairy where she sells dairy products. Sadie has a certain amount of respect for Hop Pop, yet ironically does not like Sprig, though she is trying to. Sadie was also a former secret agent. In the epilogue, Sadie purchases one of Maddie's potions.
 Archie (vocal effects provided by Dee Bradley Baker) - Sadie's pet spider.
 Felicia Sundew (voiced by Kaitlyn Robrock) - Ivy's mother, Sylvia's daughter, the proprietor of "Felicia's Tea Shoppe", and a member of the Sundew family. She was entranced with her daughter loving Sprig and got mildy annoyed at the Plantars in general, but soon came to respect them. She has a deep love for her restaurant and her daughter and it is revealed that she was once an adventurer and hopes to one day take Ivy with her on one. Because of this, she is well versed in Muay Thai, or at least something similar to it.
 Sylvia Sundew (voiced by Mona Marshall) - Felicia Sundew's mother, Ivy's grandmother, Hopediah's love interest, and a member of the Sundew Family. She has always harbored feelings for Hop Pop because she "has a thing for the weird ones". She is considered an honorary Plantar. In the epilogue, it is implied that Sylvia settled with Hop Pop as she is seen relaxing alongside him.
 Ivy Sundew (voiced by Katie Crown) - Felicia Sundew's daughter, Sylvia's granddaughter, Sprig's childhood friend, and a member of the Sundew Family. She was forced into a courtship with him, but decided to remain friends. She eventually reciprocates his feelings and they become a couple. Upon Sprig's return to Wartwood Swamp, she begins openly dating him. She has bushy hair under her beanie. Ivy learns that her mother has been secretly training her to defend herself when the time comes for her to take her on an adventure. When Sprig and his family return to Wartwood, they resume their relationship tenfold, much to the annoyance of everyone. However, they decide to dial it back a bit after they nearly ruin a mission. In the epilogue, Ivy has taken up adventuring and leaves with Sprig to explore a newly discovered continent.
 Leopold Loggle (voiced by Brian Maillard) - An axolotl who is the town's wood-smith and is the proprietor of his woodcraft store. He used to be a metalsmith until an incident where he accidentally impaled his voice box causing him to have speaking issues where he says introducing adverbs and pauses before saying a negative ending word, a trait that some find annoying. Following Anne and the Plantars return to Wartwood, Loggle is revealed to have become enormously buff. By the time of the epilogue, Loggle's body has reverted to normal, noting that he shouldn't have taken a cheat day.
 Albus Duckweed (voiced by Kevin McDonald) - A newt who is the local food critic. He also acts as a master of ceremonies at different events.
 Stumpy (voiced by John DiMaggio) - The cook and proprietor of "Stumpy's Diner" with interchangeable prosthetic hands. He was ready to resign his dilapidated restaurant, but he regains his gumption when Anne turns it into a Thai-Frog fusion restaurant. 
 Mr. Flour (voiced by Kevin Michael Richardson) - The baker, proprietor of "Flour & Daughters Bakery", and the father of Maddie, Rosemary, Ginger, and Lavender Flour. He seemed keen on having Sprig become betrothed to his daughter Maddie in earlier episodes.
 Maddie Flour (voiced by Jill Bartlett) - Mr. Flour's eerie yet understanding daughter, Rosemary, Ginger, and Lavender Flour's older sister, expert of magic and Sprig's ex-fiancée who works at "Flour & Daughters Bakery." She was initially betrothed to Sprig so that Anne could get flour dough which Maddie seemed happy about. When Sprig broke up with her, she was disappointed, but remained friends with him. Although she seems creepy, she is kind and understanding. She used to play with her younger siblings on a regular basis, but became absorbed by her hobby in magic. She ultimately learns to make time for them. In the epilogue, Maddie has opened up her own apothecary and sells one of her potions to Sadie.
 Rosemary, Ginger, and Lavender Flour (voiced by Eden Riegel in "Civil Wart", Marlow Barkley, Ella Allan, and Mia Allan in Season 2) - Maddie's younger tadpole siblings and Mr. Flour's younger daughters. They love their older sister and want nothing more than to spend time with her. In the epilogue, the girls have grown their legs but are still tadpoles and help Maddie run her apothecary.
 Soggy Joe (voiced by Fred Tatasciore) - A frog survivalist who has a nose for succulent smells. He is a trucker on the side and seems understanding of Polly. Soggy Joe was later seen with the resistance when Anne reunites with Domino II which he identifies as a Coastal Kill-a-Moth. Soggy Joe is also the star of the "Wild Amphibia" shorts.
 Fern (voiced by Natalie Palamides) - A resident in Wartwood who works as a barber and hairdresser at Hair Are Frogs. Despite her job, Fern is very relaxed to the point that she is slightly inattentive and aloof. She is the only person in Wartwood who apparently did not know that Sprig and Ivy were in a relationship as seen when they and Stumpy were paired up with her in one of Sasha's missions.
 Tuti (voiced by April Winchell) - The town masseuse and a part-time bounty hunter.
 Tad (voiced by Sam Riegel) - A glass artisan. When the acting troupe that was supposed to perform in Wartwood Swamp had to cancel due to them getting eaten, Anne enlisted Tad to make a large glass screen which she combined with her phone to show the citizens of Wartwood Swamp a movie.
 Chuck (voiced by Matt Braly) - A tulip farmer who wears a hat that covers his eyes. He mostly says "I grow tulips". Chuck is also amazingly fast at building things and watches over the Plantar family's house while they are away in Newtopia.
 Monroe (voiced by Paul Eiding) - Hopediah's rival for Sylvia Sundew's affection.
 Quentin (voiced by Scott Menville) - A cashier at Grub & Go.
 Gunther (voiced by Chris Sullivan) - A southern tusked frog who is calm and kind, but becomes large and monstrous when angered. He lives outside of Wartwood Swamp.
 Barry (voiced by Keith Silverstein) - A jovial candy berry maker who holds grudges against anyone who spills his candy berries and makes spells and curses on the side which earned him the wrath of Maddie. Barry later takes part in the anarchy by leading a group of Marauders. With Toadie's help, the Marauders are defeated with Maddie turning Barry into a chicken.
 Frobo (voiced by Matt Braly) - An enigmatic Frobot (short for frog-robot) that rested in the Ruins of Despair. Once Anne and the Plantars left, it suddenly came to and began following them. He finally arrives in Wartwood Swamp where he is adopted by Polly before the rest of the Plantars after a serious misunderstanding from the locals. He is capable of gardening and making toast, as well as many other things. During the battle against Andrias and his army of evil robots, Frobo is destroyed; leaving only his head. Anne and the Plantars manage to bring Frobo's head with them when they escape to Los Angeles. He is partially rebuilt, but gets reduced to a talking head. He returns to Amphibia with Anne and the Plantars, but has his head placed on top of an RC car. Frobo eventually receives a new body by Polly and now resembles a fighting robot. During the epilogue, Frobo continues to help the Plantars with their gardening.
 Zechariah Nettles - A scary-looking frog who wears a top hat and possesses a creepy smile, a hook hand and a lantern. Despite his frightening appearance and harsh actions, he is actually a spirit that helps guide travelers on the right path home. His spirit might live in Wartwood Swamp as he can be seen in the group photo at the end of "Battle of the Bands".

Toad Tower inhabitants
The following characters are inhabitants of Toad Tower:

 Bog (voiced by Darin De Paul) - A ruthless toad soldier and tax collector who wields a giant hammer. He and the rest of the toad army abandoned Grime offscreen after the destruction of Toad Tower. Bog and the remnants of Grime's army began operating as bandits. He later becomes the new head of Toad Tower after Toadstool saves Wartwood from him and the army. Bog was later seen during the battle against Andrias' forces. In the epilogue, Bog is mentioned to have started a junk-collecting business.
 Fens (voiced by April Winchell) - An aggressive female toad soldier who fights with a kanabō. She left Grime's army along with the rest after Toad Tower was destroyed. Fens later joined the remnants of Grime's army when they were operating as bandits until Bog is named the new head of Toad Tower. Fens was later seen during the battle against Andrias' forces. In the epilogue, Fens is mentioned to be part of Bog's junk-collecting business.
 Mire - A toad soldier in full body armor who doesn't speak and mostly growls. He left Grime's army after Toad Tower's destruction with the rest of the toad soldiers. Mire later joined the remnants of Grime's army when they were operating as bandits until Bog is named the new head of Toad Tower. Mire was later seen during the battle against Andrias' forces. In the epilogue, Mire is mentioned to be part of Bog's junk-collecting business.
 Percy (voiced by Matt Jones) - A friendly toad soldier who dreams of being a jester. In season 2, he and Braddock are the only toad soldiers left in Grime's army who did not abandon him. He, along with Braddock, eventually do leave when Sasha's actions negatively affect them. Sasha later instructs Grime to find Percy and Braddock so that he can tell them her apology and her goodbye.
 Braddock (voiced by Kristen Johnston in Season 1, April Winchell in Season 2) - A friendly female toad soldier who likes to garden and socialize. She and Percy are the only toad soldiers left in Grime's army after the rest deserted him when Toad Tower was destroyed. She, along with Percy, eventually do leave when Sasha's actions negatively affect them. Sasha later instructs Grime to find Percy and Braddock so that he can tell them her apology and her goodbye.
 Captain Beatrix "Bea" (voiced by Aisling Bea) - A cane toad who is the Captain of the West Toad Tower and Grime's older sister whom he would tease. After King Andrias' true motives were known, Beatrix later sent a letter to Grime that she and the toads with her evaded capture. She later offers her services to help the resistance if Sprig can beat her. If he wins, her army will join their army. If she wins, they all join her army as cannon fodder. Sprig manages to defeat Beatrix in a cage match, allowing her to uphold her agreement in joining the resistance. She leads the toads in the final rebellion against Andrias.
 Captain Bufo (voiced by Daisuke Tsuji) - Captain of the East Toad Tower.
 Captain Aldo (voiced by Ron Cephas Jones) - Captain of the North Toad Tower who looks old and decrepit. He is covered in plants, has eyes deeply sunken into his head, and only speaks when necessary.

Newtopia inhabitants
The following characters are inhabitants of Newtopia:

 Joe Sparrow - A giant sparrow that serves as Marcy's steed and mode of transportation. He likes to flirt with Bessie. During the epilogue, Joe and Bessie have produced hybrid children together. His name is a reference to concept artist Joe Sparrow.
 Lady Olivia (voiced by Michelle Dockery) - An aquamarine newt who is Andrias' royal adviser. She is shown to be very uptight and proper, getting easily annoyed at the reckless behaviors of the Plantars. Olivia later learns of her king's true intentions to conquer the different dimensions. In "Olivia & Yunan", it is revealed that she inherited her position from her mother, whom she deeply respects while also having helped to heal Marcy upon her arrival. Upon Amphibia starting to be mined for all of its resources, Olivia now wants to free Newtopia from King Andrias. Her fear was exploited during the mission that had Olivia being bereted by her mother for her failure. She and Yunan team up to rescue Marcy, but end up failing when they were intercepted by Andrias. Lady Olivia and General Yunan were outfitted with mind-control collars by the time Anne, Sasha, Grime, Frobo and the Plantars storm King Andrias' castle. Anne and Sasha free Lady Olivia and General Yunan from the mind-control collars as they try to warn them about the Core to no avail. Both of them were also ensnared by the Core and were taken prisoner. After escaping, she aids Sasha and Grime in freeing Marcy. In the epilogue, Olivia discusses settling down in Wartwood with Yunan, with whom she is now in a relationship.
 General Yunan Longclaw (voiced by Zehra Fazal) - A Yunnan lake newt with retractable claws in her gauntlets who describes herself as Newtopia's "Scourge of the Sand Wars, Defeater of Ragnar the Wreched, and the youngest newt to achieve the rank of the great Newtopian Army". She is very ruthless and bloodthirsty that she disposed of her own army because she felt they held her back. Yunan has a habit of introducing herself in a flashy manner, but gets annoyed when people do not recognize her. Yunan tried hunting down Captain Grime only for her to get outwitted by him and Sasha. She is loyal to King Andrias, but appears unaware of his true motives until he begins his plans to conquer the different dimensions. Yunan later teams up with Olivia to rescue Marcy, but ends up failing upon being intercepted by Andrias. In that same episode, it is revealed that she has a fear of grubhogs due to an incident in her childhood that had a grubhog nearly eating her arm off. General Yunan and Lady Olivia were outfitted with mind-control collars by the time Anne, Sasha, Grime, Frobo and the Plantars storm King Andrias' castle. Anne and Sasha free Lady Olivia and General Yunan from the mind-control collars as they try to warn them about the Core to no avail. Both of them were also ensnared by the Core and were taken prisoner. After escaping, she aids Sasha and Grime in freeing Marcy. In the epilogue, Yunan has retired and is now in a relationship with Olivia. Fazal drew inspiration from characters such as Pokémon Team Rocket and Darkwing Duck for her performance.
 Barley, Blair, and Branson (voiced by Sam Riegel) - King Andrias' trio of technicians whom he playfully refers to as "Triple B". The three are socially inept and are sometimes used as guinea pigs by King Andrias.
 Efty (voiced by Brielle Milla) - A young axolotl girl with a pet kill-a-pillar that Anne helps.
 Doris (voiced by Tress MacNeille) - An elderly newt who knits and loves puzzles and befriends Anne easily.
 Gertie (voiced by Nicole Byer) - An axolotl who runs a "Gnatchos" stand who offers good advice to Anne who in turn helps her.
 Bella (voiced by Kristen Schaal) - An overworked bellhop newt who runs afoul of Sprig, but ends up befriending him. She later made a cameo taking part in the Resistance's battle against Andrias' forces.
 Jerry (voiced by Jack Ferraiolo in "Lost in Newtopia", Fred Tatasciore in "Newts in Tights") - An axolotl who works as a spicy food vendor.
 Professor Herringbone (voiced by Flula Borg) - The headmaster at Newtopia University who sees potential in Sprig.
 Professor Scalini (voiced by Kari Wahlgren) - A teacher at Newtopia University.
 Sal (voiced by Maurice LaMarche) - An old friend of Hopediah's and former Wartwood Swamp citizen who created a special sauce and became a huge success in Newtopia after leaving Wartwood.
 Priscilla "The Killa" Paddock (voiced by Misty Lee) - A large toughened newt who rivals Anne for a special teapot. It is revealed to have sentimental value to her as it was made by her mother, Penny, before she passed and is allowed it after Anne wins it.
 Pearl Paddock (voiced by Romi Dames) - Priscilla's tiny daughter who is happy and supportive of her mother.
 Jacinda (voiced by Salli Saffioti) - An emissary of Newtopia who offers the position of Toad Tower to Mayor Toadstool. She instead decides to offer the position to Bog due to his ruthlessness while Toadstool is deemed "soft" and she becomes Bog's new assistant.
 Bernardo (voiced by Thomas Middleditch) - A fashion designer from Newtopia who is an expert in body armor.
 Frobots - The frog-like robots that work for King Andrias and the Core. Each one of them comes in their own class. Frobo was an ancient Frobot who sided with Anne and the Plantars. The following are the known Frobots in this show:
 Cloak-Bot (voiced by Troy Baker) - A sinister stealthy Frobot who works under King Andrias and is determined to kill Anne at all costs while obtaining the latest issue of a novel series that Marcy got King Andrias hooked on. It pursued Anne and her family to a grocery store where Anne used her powered-up abilities to badly damage it. It was able to repair itself until it was finally destroyed via self-destructing while Anne uses her powered-up state to kick Cloak-Bot into the sky. His right arm was later salvaged by Robert Otto. More Cloak-Bots later appear defending the forcefield generator where they fought against Yunan and Olivia.
 Giant Frobot (voiced by Troy Baker) - A gigantic golden Frobot that was dispatched to Wartwood. Some silver versions of this Frobot were seen fighting the Resistance.
 Dwarf Frobots - The tadpole-themed Frobots produced by the Giant Frobot.
 Fire Frobots - A type of Frobot with flamethrowers. The Fire Frobots tracked Anne, the Plantars, and Loggle to Gardenton where they started to burn everything. They are defeated by Apothecary Gary and the Gardenton inhabitants.
 Judge Frobot (voiced by Fred Tatasciore) - A judge-themed Frobot who was used to dispense justice on Tritonio's group. It wields a gavel in battle. It took the combination of Anne, Sprig, Tritonio, and his group to destroy the Judge Frobot.
 Hooded Frobots (voiced by Fred Tatasciore) - The servants of Judge Frobot.
 Royal Guard Frobots (voiced by Matt Braly) - Purple Frobots that wield lances and shields that can extend.
 Butler Frobots (voiced by Matt Chapman) - Butler-themed Frobots that serve drinks to King Andrias.
 Dragonfly Drones - A group of dragonfly-type drones that were first used by Cloak-Bot. One Dragonfly Drone was used to track Anne, the Plantars, and Loggle to Gardenton and alerted the Fire Frobots.
 King Aldrich (voiced by William Houston) - Andrias' father and the previous king of Amphibia. He is ruthless and determined to continue the invasion of Earth. Aldrich's consciousness is revealed to be held within the Core.
 Barrel (voiced by Jason Ritter) - A tough, yet friendly toad who wields a powerful hammer. He was once friends with Andrias, but following a bitter falling out, was relegated to guarding the frog villages on the outskirts of Amphibia. His hammer was later sought out by Grime.
 Leif (voiced by Cassandra Lee Morris) - A young and nimble frog who was once close friends with Andrias, and an ancestor of the Plantars. She had a vision of Amphibia's destruction, but was labeled a traitor, forcing her to steal the music box and flee Newtopia, forever ruining her relationship with Andrias. It is revealed via a letter she wrote that she fled to Wartwood and changed her name to Lily Plantar, marrying a native farmer and started the Plantar family. However, she never forgot Andrias and hoped that he would not stay angry at her. Her letter eventually reaches him, thanks to Sprig.

Road to Newtopia
The following characters are encountered during the Plantar's journey to Newtopia:

 Bitties (voiced by Eden Riegel and Sam Riegel) - A race of small frogs that live in Bittyburg.
 Bailey (voiced by Julian Edwards) - A young Bitty that lives in Bittyburg with his father and sister.
 Bailey's Father (voiced by Keith Ferguson) - The unnamed father of Bailey.
 Hasselback Family - A group of outlaws who terrorized the Bitties of Bittyburg.
 Mama Hasselback (voiced by Jenifer Lewis) - The giant elderly toad who is the matriarch of the Hasselback Family.
 Judro Hasselback (voiced by Keith Ferguson) - Mama's son and second-in-command with an eyepatch.
 Heathro Hasselback (voiced by Keith Ferguson) - Mama's other son and Judro's brother who is intimidating.
 Ruth Hasselback (voiced by Eden Riegel) - Mama's newt daughter and Judro and Heathro's half-sister who is cruel.
 Talbert Hasselback (voiced by Keith Ferguson) - Mama's frog brother with a big mustache who is the uncle of Judro, Heathro, and Ruth.
 Renee Frodgers (voiced by Susan Egan) - A famous stage actress, playwright and director and Hop Pop's idol. She has since used her acting and traveling theater as a cover to rob towns blind. Renee was thwarted in her latest heist by Hop Pop and arrested by the local sheriff.
 Francis / François (voiced by Max Mittelman) - An obnoxious child method actor who is part of Renee's troupe.
 Wigbert Ribbiton (voiced by Hugh Bonneville) - Wally's wealthy father in a monocle who resides in Ribbitvale. He despised his son's nomad lifestyle, but learned to accept him for who he is as well as revealed that he plays the jug. He is later seen giving the Wartwood Resistance supplies in their fight against King Andrias as some of the Wartwood citizens notice that he is similar to Wally.
 Crumpet the Frog (voiced by Matt Vogel) - The announcer for Beast Polo. He is physically based on Kermit the Frog, whom his voice actor also performs.
 The Curator / Mr. Ponds (voiced by Alex Hirsch) - The sinister eyepatch-wearing owner of the Curiosity Hut wax museum, who attempted to turn Anne into another one of his exhibits. When his prisoners were freed from their wax prison, they drag him into another room and kill him despite claiming that the red liquid that went under the door was red wax. He is a frog version of the character Grunkle Stan from Gravity Falls, on which Braly served as a storyboard artist and director.
 Frog Soos (voiced by Alex Hirsch) - The Curator's assistant. He is a frog version of the character Soos from Gravity Falls.
 Frog Shmebulock (voiced by Alex Hirsch) - One of the Curator's prisoners. He is a frog version of the character Shmebulock from Gravity Falls.

Proteus inhabitants
The following characters are the olm residents of the underground city of Proteus:

 Lysil and Angwin (voiced by Laila Berzins and Chris Wylde) - Twin-sided olms who constantly bicker with one another on how to devour their prey. Sprig and Polly outwit and escape them when they try to eat them. Later, Anne, Sasha, and the Plantars return to get information from them, where they admit that they are banished from their home city of Proteus. Despite this, they put their life on the line to rescue it and are allowed back in as a result.
 Parisia (voiced by Rachel House) - The leader of the olms in the city of Proteus who is stubbornly in denial about King Andrias' forces closing in on them and refuses to help or be offered help from others. After Sasha insults her, she finds her determination amusing and allows her to see the Mother of Olms.
 Mother Olm (voiced by Whoopi Goldberg) - The wisest of all the olms who is so large that the inside of her head is like a building, complete with a door where her eardrum is. The reason why Mother Olm heard flapping in her head was because there was a swarm of batsquitos (a race of bat/mosquito hybrids) where her brain is. She knows about the prophecy and aids Anne, Sasha, and the Plantars with their quest be deciphering the prophecy that she wrote down on the ceiling when the special brain cream that was applied to her had expired 70 years ago. She states that whatever powers Anne, Sasha, and Marcy got from the music box must be reclaimed from the clutches of King Andrias. Mother Olm later shows up at the resistance headquarters to warn them that King Andrias is going to invade Earth tonight. Mother Olm informs the group about the prophecy at the time when the Core takes control of the Moon. She does give Anne the information about a spell of last resort involving the stones that would cost its user their life. Mother Olm later mourns Anne's death until the Guardian of the Stones restores her to life where Mother Olm is last seen looking happy to see Anne alive.

Los Angeles inhabitants
The following are inhabitants of Los Angeles on Earth:

 Mrs. Boonchuy (voiced by On Braly) - Anne's mother and co-proprietor of Thai Go who appears very strict, but is very caring towards her daughter. She is bilingual and loves singing old Thai songs despite being "tone deaf". She had trouble accepting the Plantars, especially Sprig whom she called "Pink Frog", but warmed up to them. It is revealed that during Anne's disappearance, Mrs. Boonchuy was consoled by her neighbors during her difficult time, and would also build several shrines and effigies of her daughter, showing that she is also a very quick and excellent artist. She learns the real reason for Anne's return and, while angry at first, agrees to help her and her friends, after realizing that her daughter was just watching out for her, her husband and the Plantars. She and her husband accept that Anne has matured significantly and proudly watch her return to Amphibia to save her friends, before confronting Mr. X with the truth. She and her husband become trained agents in the fight against Andrias. Mrs. Boonchuy is voiced by Braly's real life mother.
 Mr. Boonchuy (voiced by Brian Sounalath) - Anne's father and co-proprietor of Thai Go who shares the same protective qualities as Hop Pop. He respects the Plantars for taking good care of Anne for the five months she was missing. Additionally, he is an online gamer. He eventually learns the real reason for Anne's return, but agrees to help her and her friends as he understands that his daughter was just looking out for him, his wife and the Plantars. He and his wife accept that Anne has matured significantly and proudly watch her return to Amphibia to save her friends, before confronting Mr. X with the truth. He and his wife become trained agents in the fight against Andrias.
 Domino - The Boonchuys' playful and shawarma-loving cat who is named after her black and white pattern.
 Maggie (voiced by Eden Riegel) - A girl at Saint James Middle School who would pick on Anne until she was repelled by Sasha. She would later witness Anne's fight with King Andrias and no longer planned to give her trouble.
 Vince (voiced by Sam Riegel) - A student at Saint James Middle School. He plays the guitar which Sasha complented on his riffing. He would later witness Anne's fight with King Andrias and no longer planned to give her trouble.
 Cheyenne - A student at Saint James Middle School. She would later witness Anne's fight with King Andrias.
 Gabby (voiced by Jessica McKenna) - Anne's hyper talkative friend who is always droning on about gossip. She would later witness Anne's fight with King Andrias.
 Ned (voiced by Wayne Knight) - The Boonchuys' biggest customer at Thai Go who had dreams of expanding their business through a food truck. Realizing that it would have been a "gross appropriation" and an incident where Sprig caused his food truck to go out of control, he gives up on this and instead becomes their delivery boy.
 Dr. Jan (voiced by Anika Noni Rose) - The curator of the Natural History Museum who is quirky and obsessed with extraterrestrials and cryptids. She immediately takes to the Plantars' appearance and aids Anne in discovering a potential way home for them. Dr. Jan later warns Anne about meeting strange scientists who would offer to help her out. Dr. Jan assists the Boonchuy family, the Plantars, and the IT Gals in making a Christmas float, and later aids the group in getting Anne and the Plantars back to Amphibia. Dr. Jan later helped in the fight against King Andrias' forces.
 The IT Gals (voiced by Melissa Villaseñor and Dana Davis) - Ally and Jess are a technology-loving couple who build and create things online. They aid Polly with rebuilding Frobo and are legitimately impressed with her and the robot's statistics. They later assist the Boonchuy family, the Plantars, and Dr. Jan in making a Christmas float, and later help Anne and the Plantars escape back to Amphibia. Ally and Jess later witnessed the fight between Anne and King Andrias.
 Mr. X (voiced by RuPaul) - A highly effeminate and enigmatic FBI agent who believes that the Plantars are aliens and plots to capture and study them. He has a disguised ice cream truck, has numerous weapons and gadgets at his disposal, wears a pair of roller shoes, and sees capturing the Plantars as a challenge. Mr. and Mrs. Boonchuy were able to help Anne and the Plantars outwit him in the movie theater. Though Mr. X vows to catch the Plantars someday. Mr. X later pursues Hop Hop when he tries to become an actor. He is once again thwarted by Anne and the Plantars. He finally manages to kidnap the Plantars, but is thwarted by Anne and her allies, before witnessing her unleash her blue energy. After Anne and the Plantars escape, the Boonchuys angrily confront Mr. X as Mrs. Boonchuy angrily plans to have him hear them out. In "All In", he becomes informed about what is happening and aids the Boonchuys and Plantars in defeating Andrias and Darcy.
 Jenny - Mr. X's silent, but loyal assistant.
 Robert Otto (voiced by Brad Garrett) - The roller skate-wearing owner of the junkyard "Otto's Auto Junk" and self-proclaimed "neighorbood safety supervisor" who fancied himself as a protector of his neighborhood. When Sprig became a superhero named Frog-Man, Robert grew jealous and used Cloak-Bot's right arm to fight him. He is later shamed by his granddaughter for being reckless and gives up villainy while helping Sprig to clean up the mess they made during their fight. After Sprig leaves, a police officer prepares to arrest Robert for his part in the property damage to which he quotes "Fair enough". When Robert puts on Cloak-Bot's right arm as well as a pair of goggles, he is a pastiche of Doctor Octopus.
 Molly Jo (voiced by Cassie Glow) - Robert's granddaughter who likes Sprig's superhero type of Frog-Man. When Robert and Sprig end up destroying the city, she angrily scolds them for being so reckless, but forgives them once they clean up the mess they made. She is a pastiche of Mary Jane Watson. Molly Jo later helps Anne and the Plantars return to Amphibia. Molly Jo witnessed the fight between Anne and King Andrias.
 Humphrey Westwood (voiced by Wallace Shawn) - An elderly janitor and aspiring actor in Hollywood who resembles Hop Pop. He is very kind and willing to give up his chances to help others, but Hop Pop ultimately decides to give up his dreams so that Humphrey can achieve his. Humphrey later helps Anne and the Plantars return to Amphibia. Humphrey later witnessed Anne's fight with King Andrias.
 Dr. Frakes (voiced by Cree Summer) - A deranged scientist who managed to create a machine that opens portals to other dimensions, but only for five seconds. Upon learning that the Plantars are frogs and being unable to find Amphibia in her machine, she tries to dissect them to achieve fame, but is defeated by Anne and Terri.
 Terri (voiced by Kate Micucci) - Dr. Frakes' former assistant. Unlike their boss, Terri is down to earth and respectful. They help Anne rescue the Plantars from their boss at the cost of their job. Terri uses their own resources to build a new portal for the Plantars, and afterwards teams up with Anne and their allies to rescue the Plantars from Mr. X and send them home. Terri later helped in the fight against King Andrias' forces. Terri comes out as non-binary in the book Marcy's Journal: A Guide to Amphibia as they switched to "they/them" pronouns.
 Street Performer (voiced by Rebecca Sugar) - A musician who walks around Los Angeles singing an original Christmas song. She is revealed in Marcy’s Journal: A Guide To Amphibia as being named Becca Salt, a parody of Rebecca Sugar’s name.
 Principal Murphy (voiced by Kimberly Brooks) - The principal of Saint James Middle School. In a flashback, she had Anne write a "Who Am I" essay after calling her, Sasha, and Marcy down to her office for throwing a K-pop party. Principal Murphy was later in her house during King Andrias' invasion and later witnessed Anne's fight with King Andrias.

Other characters
 Domino II - A Kill-a-pillar, later Coastal Kill-a-moth, that Anne adopts and names after her cat back home. Anne grows attached to her despite her violent tendencies and is forced to let her go once she transforms into an adult moth. She later has "kittens" and is rescued by Anne and Sprig. Domino II is revealed to be the Alpha Moth and officially leads the rebellion's flying artillery. Anne and Sasha later ride Domino II during the battle against King Andrias' forces.
 Mudmen (voiced by Bill Farmer and Fred Tatasciore) - A group of cannibalistic frogs that cover themselves in mud from the mud swamps that they live on so that they can ambush, kill, and eat trespassers while passing themselves off as cryptids. One Mudman was later seen at the Bizarre Bazaar.
 Moss Man - A mysterious moss based humanoid creature that stalks the lands of Amphibia. Only Anne and One-Eyed Wally seem to have seen him, but his elusiveness have made it difficult for others to believe he exists. It is later revealed that King Andrias somehow captured him and used his DNA to improve Newtopia's medical technology to revive Marcy. There is actually more than one Moss Man that were created by Leif the frog. A Moss Man later appeared to help fight the Frobots as Wally quotes to the other frogs that he told them that the Moss Men existed.
 Jonah (voiced by Jeff Bergman) - A bullfrog who is Mrs. Croaker's former arch-enemy.
 Teddy (voiced by Chris Sullivan) - A cannibalistic horned bullfrog who runs a bed and breakfast where they leave traps for the snails owned by the passersby, offer them one of the inn's rooms, and then abduct them using drugged cookies so that he and his horned bullfrog friends can eat them.
 Martha (voiced by Kari Wahlgren) - Teddy's wife and a cannibalistic horned bullfrog who runs a bed and breakfast where they capture and eat passersby.
 Juliet (voiced by Kari Wahlgren) - A cannibalistic horned bullfrog associated with Teddy and Martha.
 Juniper (voiced by Kari Wahlgren) - A cannibalistic horned bullfrog associated with Teddy and Martha.
 Valeriana (voiced by Susanne Blakeslee) - A mysterious one-armed newt who runs an antique stand at the Bizarre Bazaar. She seems to know something about the Calamity Box and Anne's destiny. She is later revealed to be the guardian of the second temple and tests Anne based on her strength of heart courage, though not before insulting her as part of the tests. Valeriana later gives Anne, Sasha, and Marcy the power to fight the Core at the time when it was planning to crash the Moon into Amphibia. She later uses the fragments of the stones to get the girls back to Earth.
 Marnie (voiced by Bill Kopp) - A proprietor at the Bizarre Bazaar who runs an underground game of beetle racing and tries to pawn off Anne's things.
 "Amphibia's Got Talent" Judges (voiced by Tara Lipinski and Johnny Weir) - Two unnamed very famous newt judges who have a keen eye for talent. They run a show that is similar to the one on Anne's world.
 Tritonio Espada (voiced by Matt Chapman) - An expert weapon combat trainer who teaches Anne, Sprig and Polly how to fight. He is actually a criminal who uses them to rob a train bound for Toad Tower. He returns, now leading a gang of thieves that rob from King Andrias. Despite his initial reluctance due to his upbringing on the streets, he is convinced by Anne to stick with his team and joins the rebellion against the king after helping to rescue his gang from Judge Frobot. He leads the newts in the final rebellion against Andrias.
 Jojo Potato (voiced by Archie Yates) - A small newt who is part of Tritonio's band of thieves and clearly looks up to him.
 Little Louise (voiced by Laila Berzins) - A large and strong newt who claims that her name is supposed to be ironic. This is, of course, a reference to Little John.
 Frog Jordan (voiced by Diedrich Bader) - A famous bugball player on Mayor Toadstool's team.
 Lydia (voiced by Eden Riegel) - A bugball player on Mayor Toadstool's team.
 Olaf - A bugball player on Mayor Toadstool's team. He is mentioned to be a transfer from out of state.
 Apothecary Gary (voiced by Tony Hale) - A large glowing fungus that took over the mind of a frog named Lloyd (also voiced by Tony Hale). He managed to escape onto Jeremy the Beetle before finding the village of Gardenton where the residents willingly submitted to him so that their crops could prosper. He attempts to attack the Plantars again, but Hop Pop convinces him that they are similar and that he should aid them in defeating Andrias following an attack by Andrias' robots. Apothecary Gary was seen during the battle against King Andrias where he has some of his fellow mushrooms planted on the Frobots.
 Shadowfish - The Shadowfish are a race of floating fish from another dimension. They were kept in the castle's dungeons which is off limits to everyone else. King Andrias later revealed to Olivia and Yunan during their attempt at rescuing Marcy that the ancient inhabitants of Amphibia studied the Shadowfish they obtained from the other dimension to cheat death which enabled Amphibia's greatest minds to come together in the Core.
 Screen Fiend - A small adorable catlike creature who lives in an internet video and emerges to reveal itself as a giant ferocious beast.
 Mr. Littlepot (voiced by George Takei) - The scary-looking personification of Death who is the reason for Hop Pop's hair loss.
 Seamstress (voiced by Matt Braly) - A glass frog who, self-conscious of her own appearance, steals other frogs' skins to hide herself. She is a parody of Leatherface from the Texas Chainsaw Massacre series.
 Horace (voiced by Fred Tatasciore) - A frog who is the resident of Gardenton.
 The Guardian (voiced by Charlyne Yi) - The supreme guardian of the gems who has been watching over the universe for eons. Its true form is an indescribable ball of light, so it takes on the form of Domino. The Guardian plans to one day pass its job over to Anne after "78 years".

References

Lists of characters in American television animation
Disney Television Animation characters
Amphibia (TV series)
Fictional extraterrestrial characters